This is a list of electoral results for the electoral district of Bulla in Victorian state elections.

Members for Bulla

Election results

Elections in the 1920s

Elections in the 1910s

 Two candidate preferred vote was estimated.

References

Victoria (Australia) state electoral results by district